Scedella longiseta is a species of tephritid or fruit flies in the genus Scedella of the family Tephritidae.

Distribution
Tanzania.

References

Tephritinae
Insects described in 1941
Diptera of Africa